Peter Torjesen (28 November 1892 – 14 December 1939) was a Norwegian missionary to China with the China Inland Mission.

When Peter was 18, he heard the call to evangelize China. That day, he not only emptied his wallet into the collection plate, but included a small note with the words, "And my life." Eight years later, in 1918, he arrived in China.

On 17 January 1923 he married Valborg in Lan Xian, China.

During the Second Sino-Japanese War Peter, and his wife Valborg opened their home and church premises in Hequ, Shanxi, to shelter up to 1,000 refugees.

Torjesen died on 14 December 1939, the result of a Japanese bombing raid at Hequ, Shanxi.

Legacy
Torjesen's family was informed by Hequ county officials in 1988 that Peter was on the county's list of "people's martyrs", and that the county wanted to erect a monument on the 50th anniversary of his death. The marble monument, with Peter's story engraved in gold characters, was unveiled in August 1990.

Bibliography
Malcolm, Kari Torjesen. We Signed Away Our Lives: How One Family Gave Everything for the Gospel, 

1892 births
1939 deaths
Norwegian expatriates in China
Protestant missionaries in China
Norwegian Protestant missionaries
Deaths by Japanese airstrikes
People killed in the Second Sino-Japanese War
Deaths by airstrike during World War II